Catherine Wilkening (born 16 July 1963 in Dijon) is a French film and television actress. She is best known for her performance as Mireille, the Mary Magdalene figure in Denys Arcand's 1989 film Jesus of Montreal, and her lead role in the French police drama television series Marc Eliot.

She garnered a Genie Award nomination as Best Actress at the 11th Genie Awards for Jesus of Montreal.

Selected filmography

References

External links

 

1963 births
French film actresses
French television actresses
Actors from Dijon
Living people